Sacrati is an Italian surname, ultimately derived from Latin săcrāti meaning "sanctified", "consecrated" or "initiated".

Notable people with this surname include:

 Alfonso Sacrati (1585–1647), Italian prelate
 Francesco Sacrati (1605-1650), Italian composer
 Francesco Sacrati (cardinal) (1567-1623), Italian cardinal

References